Tun Mohamad Adnan Robert (born Michael "Mickey" Robert; 10 September 1917 – 2 August 2003) was the sixth Governor of the Malaysian state of Sabah.

Honours

Honour of Malaysia
  : 
 Grand Commander of the Order of the Defender of the Realm (SMN) – Tun (1979)
 :
 Knight Grand Commander of the Order of the Defender of State (DUPN) – Dato' Seri Utama (1980)

References

1917 births
2003 deaths
People from Sabah
Kadazan-Dusun people
Converts to Islam from Roman Catholicism
Malaysian people of English descent
Malaysian Muslims
Yang di-Pertua Negeri of Sabah
Grand Commanders of the Order of the Defender of the Realm